The 1998 NCAA Division I women's soccer tournament (also known as the 1998 NCAA Women's College Cup) was the 17th annual single-elimination tournament to determine the national champion of NCAA Division I women's collegiate soccer. The semifinals and championship game were played again at the UNCG Soccer Stadium in Greensboro, North Carolina during December 1998.

Florida defeated North Carolina in the final, 1–0, to win their first national title. Coached by Becky Burleigh, the Gators finished the season 26–1. Florida won the championship in just their first appearance in the College Cup, a feat matched only by USC in 2007.

The most outstanding offensive player was Danielle Fotopoulos from Florida, and the most outstanding defensive player was Meredith Flaherty, also from Florida. Fotopoulos and Flaherty, along with ten other players, were named to the All-tournament team.

The tournament's leading scorer, with 3 goals, was Meredith Florance from North Carolina.

Qualification

All Division I women's soccer programs were eligible to qualify for the tournament. The tournament field expanded again, this time increasing from 32 teams to 48.

Format
To accommodate the sixteen additional teams, an additional round was added to the tournament for the thirty-two lowest-seeded teams. The top sixteen teams, meanwhile, were given a bye into the Second Round.

Teams

Bracket

All-tournament team
Keisha Bell, Florida
Lorrie Fair, North Carolina
Meredith Flaherty, Florida (most outstanding defensive player)
Meredith Florance, North Carolina
Michelle French, Portland
Danielle Fotopoulos, Florida (most outstanding offensive player)
Angela Harrison, Portland
Heather Mitts, Florida
Cindy Parlow, North Carolina
Tiffany Roberts, North Carolina
Laurie Schwoy, North Carolina
Nikki Serlenga, Santa Clara

See also 
 NCAA Division II Women's Soccer Championship
 NCAA Division III Women's Soccer Championship

References

NCAA
NCAA Women's Soccer Championship
NCAA Division I Women's Soccer Tournament
NCAA Division I Women's Soccer Tournament